Billy Free Municipal Airport  is a public use airport in Desha County, Arkansas, United States. The airport is owned by the City of Dumas and located two nautical miles (4 km) west of its central business district. It is included in the National Plan of Integrated Airport Systems for 2011–2015, which categorized it as a general aviation facility.

Facilities and aircraft 
Billy Free Municipal Airport covers an area of 73 acres (30 ha) at an elevation of 164 feet (50 m) above mean sea level. It has one runway designated 18/36 with an asphalt surface measuring 5,003 by 75 feet (1,525 x 23 m).

For the 12-month period ending November 30, 2010, the airport had 11,050 aircraft operations, an average of 30 per day: 99.5% general aviation and 0.5% military. At that time there were 18 aircraft based at this airport: 89% single-engine, 6% multi-engine, and 6% helicopter.

References

External links 
 Billy Free Municipal Airport at City of Dumas website
 Billy Free Municipal Airport (0M0) at Arkansas Department of Aeronautics
 Aerial image as of February 2001 from USGS The National Map
 
 
 

Airports in Arkansas
Transportation in Desha County, Arkansas
Buildings and structures in Desha County, Arkansas